Karitinden is a mountain in the Tafjordfjella mountain range inside Reinheimen National Park on the border of Innlandet and Møre og Romsdal counties in Norway. The top of the mountain is a tripoint border junction for Skjåk Municipality (in Innlandet county), and Fjord Municipality and Rauma Municipality (in Møre og Romsdal county). Other mountains that surround the mountain include Benkehøa to the southeast, Veltdalseggi to the south, and Tordsnose to the southwest.

Name
The first element is the female name Kari and the last element is the finite form of tind which means "mountain peak". The reason for the name, and who the person Kari was, is unknown.

See also
List of mountains of Norway

References

Fjord (municipality)
Skjåk
Rauma, Norway
Mountains of Innlandet
Mountains of Møre og Romsdal
One-thousanders of Norway